William Brochtrup Jr. (born March 7, 1963) is an American actor. He is known for his role playing PAA John Irvin, a gay police public assistant, on the ABC television drama NYPD Blue.

Early life and education
Born William Brochtrup Jr. in Inglewood, California, Brochtrup was raised in Tacoma, Washington and graduated from New York University's Tisch School of the Arts in 1985.

Career 
After graduating from college, Brochtrup moved to Los Angeles to pursue an acting career. He was billed as "William Brochtrup" in some of his earliest roles in the 1980s.

Theatre credits for Brochtrup include David Marshall Grant's Snakebit (off-Broadway at the Century Center and in Los Angeles at the Coast Playhouse), South Coast Repertory (Noises Off, Taking Steps, The Real Thing), The Antaeus Company (Peace In Our Time, The Malcontent, Cousin Bette, Tonight at 8.30, Sinan Unel's Pera Palas), Black Dahlia Theatre (Jonathan Tolins' Secrets of the Trade, Richard Kramer's Theater District, both directed by Matt Shakman), The Odyssey Theatre Ensemble (Bach at Leipzig, Small Tragedy), L.A. Theatre Works (The Great Tennessee Monkey Trial, The Caine Mutiny Court-Martial), and Pasadena Playhouse (If Memory Serves).

He appeared in the feature films Life as We Know It, He's Just Not That Into You, Duck, Ravenous, Man of the Year, and Space Marines.

Brochtrup has been a series regular on three Steven Bochco shows: CBS sitcom Public Morals, ABC drama Total Security, and seven seasons on the ABC drama NYPD Blue. He has appeared on television shows as varied as Dexter, Without a Trace, the animated children's series The Wild Thornberrys (as the voice of a dolphin), Major Crimes (as Dr. Joe Bowman), and Bravo's Celebrity Poker Showdown. Brochtrup is a frequent guest host of the PBS newsmagazine In The Life.

He has written for Out magazine. The best-selling book of essays I Love You, Mom! includes his original stories at Un-Cabaret and numerous spoken word events. He has hosted AIDS Walks across the country, supports animal rescue organizations like the Society for the Prevention of Cruelty to Animals, and has travelled the Persian Gulf, Atlantic, Mediterranean, Germany, Japan, Bosnia and Kosovo meeting servicemen and women during Handshake Tours for the United Service Organizations (USO) and Armed Forces Entertainment.

Personal life 
Brochtrup came out to People magazine as gay in 1997. He said, "[C]asting directors have known [that] for years," and assured that being gay would have no "adverse effect" on his career, even with potential typecasting. In 2012, Brochtrup said that he has not regretted coming out back then.

Filmography

Films

TV

References

External links
 
 
 
 Cascone A., Sharpe M. "MCTV Exclusive - The Doctor Is In: Bill Brochtrup Talks LA Theatre, Dr. Joe, and Major Crimes", MCTV, August 4, 2014

1963 births
American male film actors
American male stage actors
American male television actors
Living people
Male actors from Inglewood, California
Male actors from Tacoma, Washington
American gay actors
Tisch School of the Arts alumni
People from Tacoma, Washington
People from Inglewood, California